Dixognatha is a genus of moths in the family Lecithoceridae. It contains the species Dixognatha nectarus, which is found in China (Sichuan).

References

Torodorinae
Monotypic moth genera